is a Japanese romantic comedy manga series written and illustrated by Aka Akasaka. It was first serialized in Shueisha's seinen manga magazine Miracle Jump from May 2015 to January 2016, and later transferred to Weekly Young Jump, where it ran from March 2016 to November 2022. Its chapters were collected in 28 tankōbon volumes. In North America, the manga is licensed in English by Viz Media.

An anime television series adaptation produced by A-1 Pictures, aired in Japan from January to March 2019. A second season aired from April to June 2020. An OVA episode was released in 2021, and a third season aired from April to June 2022. An anime film titled The First Kiss That Never Ends premiered in theaters in December 2022. It was also adapted into a live-action film directed by Hayato Kawai, which was released in Japan in September 2019. The anime series is licensed in North America by Aniplex of America.

As of December 2022, the manga had over 22 million copies in circulation, making it one of the best-selling manga series. In 2020, Kaguya-sama: Love Is War won the 65th Shogakukan Manga Award in the general category.

Premise

In the senior high school division of Shuchiin Academy, student council president Miyuki Shirogane and vice president Kaguya Shinomiya appear to be a perfect match. Kaguya is the daughter of a wealthy conglomerate family, and Miyuki is the top student at the school and well-known across the prefecture. Although they like each other, they are too proud to confess their love, as they believe whoever does so first would "lose" in their relationship. The story follows their many schemes to make the other one confess or at least show signs of affection.

Halfway through the series, they manage to confess to each other. From there, focus shifts on how they advance their relationship and deal with remaining obstacles. The presence and complexity of several other characters notably increases over time as well.

Production

Conception
Akasaka was writing the manga Instant Bullets for Young Jump and wanted to come up with another series. In an interview on Livedoor News, Akasaka said the original plot for Kaguya-sama was more of a fantasy and game of death, but his editor wanted something more mainstream and, at the time, Young Jump did not have a casual romcom series. It was Akasaka's first manga in the romcom genre.

Akasaka set the series in high school as it was a time when he did not have much experience with dating and romance himself. He was thinking of high school relationships while smoking some food, and came up with the concept of wanting to reclaim some of his emotions of his youth in a fantasy. He envisioned "two tsunderes who like each other having battles of the mind". He thought that was a very common concept, but was surprised to find that readers were telling him that his premise was innovative. Also at first, he wanted to do more intellectual battles like Death Note but the theme changed more to "clashing of romantic emotions". He has also cited School Rumble as an influence on his work.

Character design
The characters' names were derived from The Tale of the Bamboo Cutter. He liked princess stories, and Kaguya-hime was one of the most famous princess stories. In developing the characters, he said that Kaguya and Miyuki initially have the same personality and thought process, like twins, which made their exposition to the reader easier to understand. He then developed more divergence between the two. Other characters were developed in the same manner, starting as shallow and template-like, but being filled with realistic feelings and drawn from the experience of the author and of others he knew. He especially liked contrasting characters whose internal personalities differ from their external portrayal.

Development and themes
In developing a chapter or story, Akasaka would think about emotions first and then write about experiencing the emotions, such as what Kaguya would feel if she were jealous. He would then arrange the characters and events around that emotion. When he thinks of some emotion that he hasn't developed into a story yet, he writes it on a sticky note or notebook to be used later.

Akasaka said that he originally wanted to make a manga that would help office ladies relax, but since he is an otaku, it seems to follow in that. He also believes the manga is more about providing the reader with something exciting and conveying meaningful messages about human relationships rather than to showcase a number of character gags and reactions. Akasaka said that Miyuki and Kaguya's becoming third-year students marks the second half of the story. When asked about the ending, he said he does not know whether he will go with the bad ending as with Kaguya-hime, but wouldn't mind if it did. He is also considering giving each character a curtain call chapter like they do in the dating sims.

Media

Manga

Aka Akasaka launched the series in the June issue of Shueisha's seinen manga magazine Miracle Jump on May 19, 2015. The series' last chapter in Miracle Jump was published on January 19, 2016. The manga was then switched to the publisher's Weekly Young Jump magazine on March 24, 2016. A special chapter ran in the debut issue of Young Jump Gold on May 18, 2017. The series finished on November 2, 2022. Shueisha has collected its 281 individual chapters into twenty-eight individual tankōbon volumes. The first volume was released on March 18, 2016, and the last on December 19, 2022.

North American publisher Viz Media announced their license to the series during their panel at San Diego Comic-Con International on July 20, 2017.

A spin-off manga by Shinta Sakayama, titled , was launched on Shueisha's Tonari no Young Jump website on June 14, 2018, and it was serialized on the second and fourth Thursdays of the month. The spin-off finished on June 25, 2020. Shueisha released four tankōbon volumes between December 19, 2018 and July 17, 2020.<ref></p></ref>

A yonkoma spin-off, written by G3 Ida and titled , was serialized in Weekly Young Jump from July 26, 2018, to November 2, 2022. The yonkoma focuses on two newspaper/press club girls who idolize Kaguya and the gang but have no clue what really goes on inside the student council. Shueisha released the first collected tankōbon volume on March 19, 2019, and the eight and last on December 19, 2022.

Anime

An anime television series adaptation was announced by Shueisha on June 1, 2018. The series is directed by Shinichi Omata under the pseudonym Mamoru Hatakeyama and written by Yasuhiro Nakanishi, with animation by A-1 Pictures. Yuuko Yahiro is providing the character designs, while Jin Aketagawa is the sound director. Kei Haneoka is composing the series' music. The series aired from January 12 to March 30, 2019, broadcasting on MBS, Tokyo MX, BS11, GTV, GYT, CTV, and TeNY. The series ran for 12 episodes. Masayuki Suzuki, Rikka Ihara, and Yoshiki Mizuno performs the series' opening song "Love Dramatic feat. Rikka Ihara", while Halca performs the series' ending theme song "Sentimental Crisis". Aniplex of America have acquired the series in North America, and streamed the series on Crunchyroll, Hulu, and FunimationNow. In Australia and New Zealand, AnimeLab simulcasted the series within the region. The series is licensed by Muse Communication and is streaming on Netflix, bilibili, iQIYI in Southeast Asia.

A second season, titled Kaguya-sama: Love Is War?, was announced on October 19, 2019. The staff and cast returned to reprise their roles. It aired from April 11 to June 27, 2020 on the Tokyo MX, GTV, GYT, BS11, Abema TV service, MBS and TeNY. The second season will feature Kaguya's character song "Kotae Awase" and a key visual with the new characters Miko and Osaragi as they join the returning main characters of the series. Suzuki returned to perform the season's opening theme "Daddy! Daddy! Do! feat. Airi Suzuki", while Haruka Fukuhara's "Kaze ni Fukarete" ("Blown by the Wind") was used as the ending. The season received its world premiere prior to Japanese broadcast at Anime Festival Sydney on March 8, 2020. Funimation acquired exclusive streaming rights for the season in late March; the company began airing an English dub for the second season on July 25, with the first season dub streaming on March 9, 2021. In Southeast Asia, Muse Communication released the season on Netflix, bilibili, iQIYI.

On October 25, 2020, an original video animation episode and a third season were concurrently announced for production during the "Kaguya-sama Wants To Tell You On Stage" special event. An OVA was bundled with the manga's twenty-second volume, which was released on May 19, 2021. On October 21, 2021, it was revealed the third season is titled Kaguya-sama: Love Is War – Ultra Romantic, with returning staff and cast members. It aired from April 9 to June 25, 2022, on Tokyo MX, BS11, Gunma TV, Tochigi TV, MBS, RKB, and TeNY. Masayuki Suzuki returned to perform the third season's opening theme "GIRI GIRI" with Suu from Silent Siren, while Airi Suzuki returned to perform the ending theme "Heart wa Oteage" ("My Heart Does Not Know What to Do"). Episode 5 features ending song "My Nonfiction" by Furukawa and Kohara's characters Miyuki Shirogane and Chika Fujiwara.

Following the conclusion of the third season, a new anime project was announced to be in production. It was later revealed that the new project is an anime film titled Kaguya-sama: Love Is War – The First Kiss That Never Ends. The main staff from the television series reprised their roles. The film premiered in theaters on December 17, 2022, before being released on television. The opening theme song is "Love is Show" by Masayuki Suzuki featuring Reni Takagi. Aniplex of America will screen the film in select U.S. theaters in February 2023.

Live-action film

The live-action film adaptation premiered in Japan on September 6, 2019. Sho Hirano was announced for the role of Miyuki Shirogane, and Kanna Hashimoto was announced for the role of Kaguya Shinomiya. Hayato Kawai directed the film, Yūichi Tokunaga wrote the screenplay, and principal photography was conducted in March to April 2019.

A sequel, Kaguya-sama Final: Love Is War was announced on January 6, 2021. It premiered in Japanese cinemas on August 20, 2021. Hirano, Hashimoto, Nana Asakawa, and Hayato Sano, actors of Kaguya Shinomiya, Miyuki Shirogane, Chika Fujiwara and Yu Ishigami respectively, returned to reprise their roles.

Reception

Manga
The manga won the 3rd Next Manga Award in the comics division for manga published in print book format in 2017. In 2020, along with Aoashi, Kaguya-sama: Love Is War won the 65th Shogakukan Manga Award in the general category. On TV Asahi's Manga Sōsenkyo 2021 poll, in which 150.000 people voted for their top 100 manga series, Kaguya-sama: Love Is War ranked 50th.

Kaguya-sama: Love Is War had over 6.5 million copies in circulation by April 2019; over 8.5 million copies by October 2019; over 9 million copies in circulation by December 2019; over 13 million copies in circulation by October 2020; over 15 million copies in circulation by April 2021; over 19 million copies in circulation by October 2022; and over 22 million copies in circulation by December 2022. It was the ninth-best-selling manga in 2019, with over 4 million copies sold.

Rebecca Silverman of Anime News Network gave the first two volumes of the manga a positive review, calling it "one of the more unique rom-com premises out there". She noted that the second volume was better than the first, indicating development on the part of the author, and commenting that it boded well for the lastingness of the series. She was more ambivalent about the art, saying that it lacked polish and that faces in particular tended to suffer.

Anime
In 2020, at the 4th Crunchyroll Anime Awards, the Kaguya-sama: Love Is War anime was selected for Best Comedy, Best Couple, and Best Ending Sequence ("Chikatto Chika Chika"). The character Chika Fujiwara was nominated for Best Girl in the awards. At the 5th Crunchyroll Anime Awards in 2021, the second season of the Kaguya-sama: Love Is War anime was selected for Best Comedy, and the main character of the series, Kaguya Shinomiya, was selected for Best Girl. The anime's opening "DADDY! DADDY! DO!" by Masayuki Suzuki was nominated for Best Opening Sequence in the awards.

Critical reception

Awards and nominations

Notes

References

External links

  
  
  
  
  at Viz Media
  at Aniplex of America
 

 
2019 anime television series debuts
2020 anime television series debuts
2022 anime television series debuts
A-1 Pictures
Anime series based on manga
Aniplex
Crunchyroll Anime Awards winners
Japanese high school television series
Kaguya-hime
Muse Communication
Psychological anime and manga
Romantic comedy anime and manga
School life in anime and manga
Seinen manga
Slice of life anime and manga
Shueisha franchises
Shueisha manga
Tokyo MX original programming
Viz Media manga
Winners of the Shogakukan Manga Award for general manga
Yonkoma